Yorktown is a neighborhood in North Philadelphia.  It is located north of Poplar and west of Ludlow.  The James R. Ludlow School and William H. Harrison School were listed on the National Register of Historic Places in 1988.

References 

Neighborhoods in Philadelphia
Lower North Philadelphia